Albany Park railway station is in the London Borough of Bexley in south-east London (Travelcard Zone 5). It is  down the line from Charing Cross. The station and all trains serving it are operated by Southeastern.

From platform one trains run westbound to London Charing Cross twice an hour, and twice per hour during the daytime, Monday to Saturday, to London Cannon Street.

From platform two trains from the station run eastbound towards Dartford continuing to Gravesend twice per hour (or Strood, Rochester or Gillingham during peak times) and to London Cannon Street via Greenwich twice an hour during the daytime, Monday to Saturday.

History 

The station was opened by the Southern Railway on 7 March 1935 following housing development in the area. The station passed on to the Southern Region of British Railways on nationalisation in 1948.

When BR was divided into sectors in the 1980s the station was served by Network SouthEast until the privatisation of British Rail.

The station had a very small one storey signal box at the Dartford end of the up platform which closed in November 1970. No goods yard or freight facilities were ever provided.

The station has changed very little over the years except for platform extensions in 1955 and the closure of the signal box.

Location
The station is located in Steynton Avenue near a small parade of shops in a largely residential area. The station building is at street level with steps down to the platforms as the line is in a cutting. There is no actual park called Albany Park, although there is nearby pub The Albany Hotel also built in the 1930s.

Services

The typical off-peak service in trains per hour is:

 2 tph to 

The station is also served by a single peak hour return service between Dartford and London Blackfriars.

Connections 
London Buses route B14 serves the station from Longmead Drive.

References 

 
 
 
 Station on navigable O.S. map

External links

Railway stations in the London Borough of Bexley
Former Southern Railway (UK) stations
Railway stations in Great Britain opened in 1935
Railway stations served by Southeastern